Agustín Saavedra Weise (19 November 1943 – 26 December 2021) was a Bolivian diplomat and writer.  He served as Ambassador to Switzerland and Argentina and ambassador-at-large in several foreign missions and was a foreign minister (1982). He wrote more than 10 books and hundreds of notes and articles. He was appointed the President of Central Bank of Bolivia in October 2020. 

Saavedra Weise died on 26 December 2021, at the age of 78.

References

External links
 Homepage 

 

1943 births
2021 deaths
Ambassadors of Bolivia to Argentina
Ambassadors of Bolivia to Switzerland
Bolivian diplomats
Bolivian male writers
Foreign ministers of Bolivia
People from Santa Cruz de la Sierra